Emanuele Bianchi (born 10 August 1984) is an Italian former footballer who played as a goalkeeper.

Career
Born in Camaiore, the Province of Lucca, Bianchi started his career at provincial capital Lucca. In 2003, Bianchi left for Sampdoria in co-ownership deal. Bianchi was an overage player for Primavera U20 reserve in 2004–05 season. In June 2005, Lucchese gave up the remain 50% registration rights to Genoese club. Bianchi then left for Serie C1 club Perugia in another co-ownership deal. In June 2006, Sampdoria gave up the rights again. Bianchi played 4 games in his 4 seasons with the Umbria club. Bianchi also returned to the reserve in the first season.

In March 2010, he joined Piacenza. The club had loaned Mario Cassano to Sampdoria (originally went to Reggina to exchange with Christian Puggioni), leaving Fabrizio Capodici, Roberto Maurantonio and Marco Serena were the backup. Bianchi became another backup of Puggioni and played once.

In August 2010, Bianchi left for Milazzo. However, in September he was released.

References

External links
 Lega Serie A Profile 
 FIGC 
 Football.it Profile 

Italian footballers
Italy youth international footballers
S.S.D. Lucchese 1905 players
U.C. Sampdoria players
A.C. Perugia Calcio players
Piacenza Calcio 1919 players
S.S. Milazzo players
Association football goalkeepers
Sportspeople from the Province of Lucca
1984 births
Living people
Footballers from Tuscany